Tom O'Sullivan is an Irish  Gaelic footballer who currently plays for Dingle and at senior level for the Kerry county team.

Honours
Kerry
 Munster Senior Football Championship: 2019, 2021
 National Football League: 2020, 2021
 McGrath Cup: 2022

Individual
All Star(2): 2019, 2021

References

Year of birth missing (living people)
Living people
All Stars Awards winners (football)
Gaelic football backs
Kerry inter-county Gaelic footballers